Shannondale Springs Wildlife Management Area is located near Charles Town, West Virginia in Jefferson County.

Access is from Charles Town four miles along State Route 9 to Mission Road, then south on Mission Road to the WMA.

Hunting, Trapping and Fishing

Hunting opportunities in Shannondale Springs WMA include deer,  mourning dove, raccoon, squirrel, turkey, waterfowl, Bear and woodcock.

Trapping opportunities can include  beaver, gray fox, red fox, mink, muskrat, opossum, raccoon, and skunk.

Fishing opportunities in the Shenandoah River include rock bass, smallmouth bass, channel catfish, and panfish.

Camping is not allowed at the WMA. A boat ramp is available to access the Shenandoah River.

See also

Animal conservation
Animal trapping
Hunting
Fishing
List of West Virginia wildlife management areas

References

External links
West Virginia DNR District 2 Wildlife Management Areas
West Virginia Hunting Regulations
West Virginia Fishing Regulations
DNR map of Shannondale Springs Wildlife Management Area

Wildlife management areas of West Virginia
Protected areas of Jefferson County, West Virginia
IUCN Category V